Dr. George Sutton Medical Office Building is a historic medical office building located at Aurora, Dearborn County, Indiana. It was built about 1870, and is a small two-story, Second Empire style brick building.  It sits on a limestone block foundation and has a mansard roof.

It was added to the National Register of Historic Places in 1994.  It is located in the Downtown Aurora Historic District.

References

External links

Commercial buildings on the National Register of Historic Places in Indiana
Second Empire architecture in Indiana
Buildings and structures completed in 1870
Buildings and structures in Dearborn County, Indiana
National Register of Historic Places in Dearborn County, Indiana
Historic district contributing properties in Indiana